The Amur whitefin gudgeon (Romanogobio tenuicorpus) is a species of cyprinid fish found in the Amur and Luang Ho drainages.

References

Romanogobio
Fish described in 1934